Văluţă is a surname. Notable people with the surname include:

Eduard Văluță (born 1979), Moldovan footballer
Ion Văluță (1894–1981), Moldovan politician

Surnames of Moldovan origin